Raphitoma natalensis is a species of sea snail, a marine gastropod mollusk in the family Raphitomidae.

Description
The shell reaches a length of 5 mm and its diameter of 2.3 mm.

Distribution
This marine species occurs off South Africa.

References

External links
 Barnard K.H. (1958),  Contribution to the knowledge of South African marine Mollusca. Part 1. Gastropoda; Prosobranchiata: Toxoglossa; Annals of the South African Museum. Annale van die Suid-Afrikaanse Museum, vol. 44
 Gastropods.com: Raphitoma natalensis

Endemic fauna of South Africa
natalensis
Gastropods described in 1958